Ian McGowan (born May 23, 1979) is an American rower. He competed in the men's quadruple sculls event at the 2000 Summer Olympics.

References

External links
 

1979 births
Living people
American male rowers
Olympic rowers of the United States
Rowers at the 2000 Summer Olympics
Rowers from Seattle